The nordic combined competition of the 2010 Winter Olympics was held at Whistler Olympic Park.  The events were held between 14 and 25 February 2010. Sprint and individual Gundersen events of 7.5 km and 15 km events were replaced by two 10 km individual events with one jump each from the normal and large hills respectively. Team event went from two jumps down for one jump per team member. This was done during the 2008–09 Nordic Combined World Cup season and was also applied to the FIS Nordic World Ski Championships 2009 in Liberec, Czech Republic.

Medal summary

Medal table

Events
Three nordic combined events were held in Vancouver 2010 (all participants are men):

Competition schedule
All times are Pacific Standard Time (UTC-8).

Qualification
For the three events, there are a maximum 55 athletes allowed to compete. No nation can have more than five skiers. For each event, no nation can enter more than four skiers per nation per individual event or one team per nation per relay race.

Host nation Canada is expected to enter skiers in all events. If no skier meets the qualification standards, they can enter one skier per event.

Quota allocation per nation was based on the World Ranking List (WRL) based on Nordic Combined World Cup and Grand Prix points, followed by Continental Cup Standings from the 2008–09 and 2009–10 Nordic Combined World Cup. This was made by assigning one quota slot per skier from the top of the standings downwards until the maximum five slots have been reached, including host nation Canada. When 50 slots are reached in an event where less than ten nations have a minimum of four skiers allocated slot (and the nation is entered in the team event), the next nation with three skiers will be given a fourth slot until ten nations can compete in the team event. Any open quota slots will be allocated until the maximum 55 skiers can be reached, including host nation Canada. This process started on 18 January 2010 and will run until 28 January 2010. Deadline to VANOC is 1 February 2010.

If a skier from a nation selected for an event cannot compete due to injury or force majeure prior to the start of the first event based on quota allocation, a replacement can be used once the removed skier surrenders their accreditation prior to their replacement can be accredited.

Participating nations 
A quota list was released by the FIS on 18 January 2010.

14 countries participated.

References

External links
May 2009 FIS Qualification for the 2010 Winter Olympics. - accessed 21 January 2010. Nordic combined is on pp. 9–10.
Vancouver 2010 Olympic Winter Games Competition Schedule v12

 
2010 Winter Olympics events
2010
Winter Olympics
Nordic combined competitions in Canada
Men's events at the 2010 Winter Olympics